The demographics of China demonstrate a huge population with a relatively small youth component, partially a result of China's one-child policy. China's population reached 1 billion in 1982.

As of December 2022, China's population stood at 1.4118 billion. According to the 2020 census, 91.11% of the population was Han Chinese, and 8.89% were minorities. China's population growth rate is only 0.03%, ranking 159th in the world. China conducted its sixth national population census in 2010, and its seventh census was completed in late 2020, with data released in May 2021. Unless otherwise indicated, the statistics on this page pertain to mainland China only; see also Demographics of Hong Kong and Demographics of Macau.

History

Population

Historical population

During 1960–2015, the population grew to nearly 1.4 billion. Under Mao Zedong, China nearly doubled in population from 540 million in 1949 to 969 million in 1979. This growth slowed because of the one-child policy instituted in 1979. The 2022 data shows a declining population for the first time since 1961.

Census data

Censuses in China

The People's Republic of China conducted censuses in 1953, 1964, 1982, 1990, 2000, and 2010. In 1987, the government announced that the fourth national census would take place in 1990 and that there would be one every ten years thereafter. The 1982 census (which reported a total population of 1,008,180,738) is generally accepted as significantly more reliable, accurate, and thorough than the previous two. Various international organizations eagerly assisted the Chinese in conducting the 1982 census, including the United Nations Fund for Population Activities, which donated US$100.0 million between 1980-1989 for a variety of projects, one of which being the 1982 census.

China has been the world's most populous nation for many centuries. When China took its first post-1949 census in 1953, the population stood at 583 million; by the fifth census in 2000, the population had more than doubled, reaching 1.2 billion.

By the sixth census in 2020, the total population had reached to 1,419,933,142, with the mainland having 1,411,778,724, Hong Kong having 7,474,200, and Macau having 683,218. However, this number is disputed by obstetrics researcher Yi Fuxian, who argues that data related to population growth is inflated by local governments to obtain financial subsidies from the central government.

Population of China by age and sex (demographic pyramid)

In 1982 China conducted its first population census since 1964. It was by far the most thorough and accurate census taken since 1949 and confirmed that China was a nation of more than 1 billion people, or about one-fifth of the world's population. The census provided demographers with a set of data on China's age-sex structure, fertility and mortality rates, and population density and distribution. Information was also gathered on minority ethnic groups, urban population, and marital status. For the first time since the People's Republic of China was founded, demographers had reliable information on the size and composition of the Chinese work force. The nation began preparing for the 1982 census in late 1976. Chinese census workers were sent to the United States and Japan to study modern census-taking techniques and automation. Computers were installed in every provincial-level unit except Tibet and were connected to a central processing system in the Beijing headquarters of the State Statistical Bureau. Pretests and small scale trial runs were conducted and checked for accuracy between 1980 and 1981 in twenty-four provincial-level units. Census stations were opened in rural production brigades and urban neighborhoods. Beginning on 1 July 1982, each household sent a representative to a census station to be enumerated. The census required about a month to complete and employed approximately 5 million census takers.

The 1982 census collected data in nineteen demographic categories relating to individuals and households. The thirteen areas concerning individuals were name, relationship to head of household, sex, age, nationality, registration status, educational level, profession, occupation, status of nonworking persons, marital status, number of children born and still living, and number of births in 1981. The six items pertaining to households were type (domestic or collective), serial number, number of persons, number of births in 1981, number of deaths in 1981, and number of registered persons absent for more than one year. Information was gathered in a number of important areas for which previous data were either extremely inaccurate or simply nonexistent, including fertility, marital status, urban population, minority ethnic groups, sex composition, age distribution, and employment and unemployment.

A fundamental anomaly in the 1982 statistics was noted by some Western analysts. They pointed out that although the birth and death rates recorded by the census and those recorded through the household registration system were different, the two systems arrived at similar population totals. The discrepancies in the vital rates were the result of the underreporting of both births and deaths to the authorities under the registration system; families would not report some births because of the one-child policy and would not report some deaths so as to hold on to the rations of the deceased.

Nevertheless, the 1982 census was a watershed for both Chinese and world demographics. After an eighteen-year gap, population specialists were given a wealth of reliable, up-to-date figures on which to reconstruct past demographic patterns, measure current population conditions, and predict future population trends. For example, Chinese and foreign demographers used the 1982 census age-sex structure as the base population for forecasting and making assumptions about future fertility trends. The data on age-specific fertility and mortality rates provided the necessary base-line information for making population projections. The census data also were useful for estimating future manpower potential, consumer needs, and utility, energy, and health-service requirements. The sudden abundance of demographic data helped population specialists immeasurably in their efforts to estimate world population. Previously, there had been no accurate information on these 21% of the Earth's inhabitants. Demographers who had been conducting research on global population without accurate data on the Chinese fifth of the world's population were particularly thankful for the 1982 breakthrough census.

Population control

Initially, China's post-1949 leaders were ideologically disposed to view a large population as an asset. But the liabilities of a large, rapidly growing population soon became apparent. For one year, starting in August 1956, vigorous support was given to the Ministry of Public Health's mass birth control efforts. These efforts, however, had little impact on fertility. After the interval of the Great Leap Forward, Chinese leaders again saw rapid population growth as an obstacle to development, and their interest in birth control revived. In the early 1960s, schemes somewhat more muted than during the first campaign, emphasized the virtues of late marriage. Birth control offices were set up in the central government and some provincial-level governments in 1964. The second campaign was particularly successful in the cities, where the birth rate was cut in half during the 1963–66 period. The upheaval of the Cultural Revolution brought the program to a halt, however.

In 1972 and 1973 the party mobilized its resources for a nationwide birth control campaign administered by a group in the State Council. Committees to oversee birth control activities were established at all administrative levels and in various collective enterprises. This extensive and seemingly effective network covered both the rural and the urban population. In urban areas public security headquarters included population control sections. In rural areas the country's "barefoot doctors" distributed information and contraceptives to people's commune members. By 1973 Mao Zedong was personally identified with the family planning movement, signifying a greater leadership commitment to controlled population growth than ever before. Yet until several years after Mao's death in 1976, the leadership was reluctant to put forth directly the rationale that population control was necessary for economic growth and improved living standards.

Population growth targets were set for both administrative units and individual families. In the mid-1970s the maximum recommended family size was two children in cities and three or four in the country. Since 1979 the government has advocated a one-child limit for both rural and urban areas and has generally set a maximum of two children in special circumstances. As of 1986 the policy for minority nationalities was two children per couple, three in special circumstances, and no limit for ethnic groups with very small populations. The overall goal of the one-child policy was to keep the total population within 1.2 billion through the year 2000, on the premise that the Four Modernizations program would be of little value if population growth was not brought under control.

The one-child policy was a highly ambitious population control program. Like previous programs of the 1960s and 1970s, the one-child policy employed a combination of public education, social pressure, and in some cases coercion. The one-child policy was unique, however, in that it linked reproduction with economic cost or benefit.

Under the one-child program, a sophisticated system rewarded those who observed the policy and penalized those who did not. Through this policy, the rate of increasing population was tempered after the penalties were made. Couples with only one child were given a "one-child certificate" entitling them to such benefits as cash bonuses, longer maternity leave, better child care, and preferential housing assignments. In return, they were required to pledge that they would not have more children. In the countryside, there was great pressure to adhere to the one-child limit. Because the rural population accounted for approximately 60% of the total, the effectiveness of the one-child policy in rural areas was considered the key to the success or failure of the program as a whole.

In rural areas the day-to-day work of family planning was done by cadres at the team and brigade levels who were responsible for women's affairs and by health workers. The women's team leader made regular household visits to keep track of the status of each family under her jurisdiction and collected information on which women were using contraceptives, the methods used, and which had become pregnant. She then reported to the brigade women's leader, who documented the information and took it to a monthly meeting of the commune birth-planning committee. According to reports, ceilings or quotas had to be adhered to; to satisfy these cutoffs, unmarried young people were persuaded to postpone marriage, couples without children were advised to "wait their turn," women with unauthorized pregnancies were pressured to have abortions, and those who already had children were urged to use contraception or undergo sterilization. Couples with more than one child were exhorted to be sterilized.

The one-child policy enjoyed much greater success in urban than in rural areas. Even without state intervention, there were compelling reasons for urban couples to limit the family to a single child. Raising a child required a significant portion of family income, and in the cities a child did not become an economic asset until he or she entered the work force at age sixteen. Couples with only one child were given preferential treatment in housing allocation. In addition, because city dwellers who were employed in state enterprises received pensions after retirement, the sex of their first child was less important to them than it was to those in rural areas.

Numerous reports surfaced of coercive measures used to achieve the desired results of the one-child policy. The alleged methods ranged from intense psychological pressure to the use of physical force, including some grisly accounts of forced abortions and infanticide. Chinese officials admitted that isolated, uncondoned abuses of the program occurred and that they condemned such acts, but they insisted that the family planning program was administered on a voluntary basis using persuasion and economic measures only. International reaction to the allegations were mixed. The UN Fund for Population Activities and the International Planned Parenthood Federation were generally supportive of China's family planning program. The United States Agency for International Development, however, withdrew US$10 million from the Fund in March 1985 based on allegations that coercion had been used.

Observers suggested that an accurate assessment of the one-child program would not be possible until all women who came of childbearing age in the early 1980s passed their fertile years. As of 1987 the one-child program had achieved mixed results. In general, it was very successful in almost all urban areas but less successful in rural areas.

Rapid fertility reduction associated with the one-child policy has potentially negative results. For instance, in the future the elderly might not be able to rely on their children to care for them as they have in the past, leaving the state to assume the expense, which could be considerable. Based on United Nations and Chinese government statistics, it was estimated in 1987 that by 2000 the population 60 years and older (the retirement age is 60 in urban areas) would number 127 million, or 10.1% of the total population; the projection for 2025 was 234 million elderly, or 16.4%. According to projections based on the 1982 census, if the one-child policy were maintained to the year 2000, 25% of China's population would be age 65 or older by 2040. In 2050, the number of people over 60 is expected to increase to 430 million. Even though China has already opened two-child policy since 2016, data shows that the second-child policy cannot stop the problem of an aging population. China needs to find an appropriate birth policy to optimize the demographic dividend, which refers to the proportion of labor-age population. On the other hand, the higher house prices squeeze the marriage in China. The house price plays an important role on the influence of marriage and fertility. The increasing house price leads to the lower marriage rate and cause the other serious social problems in China. For the rapid reduction of marriage and fertility, the central government should establish the policy to deal with the high house price.

Population density and distribution

China is the most populated country in the world and its national population density (137/km2) is very similar to those of countries like Denmark (excluding Greenland) or the Czech Republic. However, the overall population density of China conceals major regional variations. In 2002, about 94% of the population lived east of the Heihe–Tengchong Line; although this eastern area comprises only 43% of China's total land area, its population density, at roughly  280/km2, is comparable to that of Japan.

Broadly speaking, the population was concentrated east of the mountains and south of the northern steppe. The most densely populated areas included the Yangtze River Valley (of which the delta region was the most populous), Sichuan Basin, North China Plain, Pearl River Delta, and the industrial area around the city of Shenyang in the northeast.

Population is most sparse in the mountainous, desert, and grassland regions of the northwest and southwest. In Inner Mongolia Autonomous Region, portions are completely uninhabited, and only a few sections have populations denser than ten people per km2. The Inner Mongolia, Xinjiang, and Tibet autonomous regions and Qinghai and Gansu comprise 55% of the country's land area but in 1985 contained only 5.7% of its population.

Vital statistics

Table of births and deaths 1949–2022

China's fertility statistics differ depending on the source. According to the Ministry of Health and Family Planning November 2015 announcement, China's 2015 Total Fertility Rate or TFR was somewhere between 1.5 and 1.6.

Total fertility rate from 1930 to 1949
Children born per woman from 1930 to 1949. It is based on fairly good data for the entire period. Sources: Our World In Data and Gapminder Foundation.

Structure of the population

Population by Sex and Age Group (Census 01.XI.2010):

Life expectancy

Source: UN World Population Prospects

The latest data from the National Bureau of Statistics (NBS) seems to contradict this, stating China's TFR for 2015 was 1.05. Although there is a natural margin of error since the NBS surveys only a thin cross-section of Chinese society, approximately 1% of the total population. Fertility according to National Bureau of Statistics (NBS):

Fertility and mortality

In 1949 crude death rates were probably higher than 30 per 1,000, and the average life expectancy was only 35 years. Beginning in the early 1950s, mortality steadily declined; it continued to decline through 1978 and remained relatively constant through 1987. One major fluctuation was reported in a computer reconstruction of China's population trends from 1953 to 1987 produced by the United States Bureau of the Census. The computer model showed that the crude death rate increased dramatically during the famine years associated with the Great Leap Forward (1958–60).

According to Chinese government statistics, the crude birth rate followed five distinct patterns from 1949 to 1982. It remained stable from 1949 to 1954, varied widely from 1955 to 1965, experienced fluctuations between 1966 and 1969, dropped sharply in the late 1970s, and increased from 1980 to 1981. Between 1970 and 1980, the crude birth rate dropped from 33.4 per 1,000 to 18.2 per 1,000. The government attributed this dramatic decline in fertility to the wǎn xī shǎo ("晚、稀、少", or "late, long, few": later marriages, longer intervals between births, and fewer children) birth control campaign. However, elements of socioeconomic change, such as increased employment of women in both urban and rural areas and reduced infant mortality (a greater percentage of surviving children would tend to reduce demand for additional children), may have played some role. The birth rate increased in the 1980s to a level over 20 per 1,000, primarily as a result of a marked rise in marriages and first births. The rise was an indication of problems with the one-child policy of 1979. Chinese sources, however, indicate that the birth rate started to decrease again in the 1990s and reached a level of around 12 per 1,000 in recent years.

In urban areas, the housing shortage may have been at least partly responsible for the decreased birth rate. Also, the policy in force during most of the 1960s and the early 1970s of sending large numbers of high school graduates to the countryside deprived cities of a significant proportion of persons of childbearing age and undoubtedly had some effect on birth rates (see Cultural Revolution (1966–76)). Primarily for economic reasons, rural birth rates tended to decline less than urban rates. The right to grow and sell agricultural products for personal profit and the lack of an old-age Welfare system were incentives for rural people to produce many children, especially sons, for help in the fields and for support in old age. Because of these conditions, it is unclear to what degree education had been able to erode traditional values favoring large families.

Today, the population continues to grow. There is also a serious gender imbalance. Census data obtained in 2000 revealed that 119 boys were born for every 100 girls, and among China's "floating population" the ratio was as high as 128:100. These situations led the government in July 2004 to ban selective abortions of female fetuses. It is estimated that this imbalance will rise until 2025–2030 to reach 20% then slowly decrease.

China now has an increasingly aging population; it is projected that 11.8% of the population in 2020 will be 65 years of age and older. Health care has improved dramatically in China since 1949. Major diseases such as cholera, typhoid, and scarlet fever have been brought under control. Life expectancy has more than doubled, and infant mortality has dropped significantly. On the negative side, the incidence of cancer, cerebrovascular disease, and heart disease has increased to the extent that these have become the leading causes of death. Economic reforms initiated in the late 1970s fundamentally altered methods of providing health care; the collective medical care system has been gradually replaced by a more individual-oriented approach.

In 2018, China had the lowest birth rate since 1961, with an estimated of 15.23 million babies being born. The birth figure was 11.6 percent lower compared with 17,23 million in 2017. Officials had expected 21-23 million births in 2018, much more than the 15.23 that occurred. James Liang, an economics professor at Peking University, stated that the apparent birth peak was in 2016, and predicted that birth rates will continue to fall dramatically and that the birthrate will not be higher than 2018 for at least 100 years.

In Hong Kong, the birth rate of 0.9% is lower than its death rate. Hong Kong's population increases because of immigration from the mainland and a large expatriate population comprising about 4%. Like Hong Kong, Macau also has a low birth rate relying on immigration to maintain its population.

Total fertility rate
According to the 2000 census, the TFR was 1.22 (0.86 for cities, 1.08 for towns and 1.43 for villages/outposts). Beijing had the lowest TFR at 0.67, while Guizhou had the highest at 2.19. The Xiangyang district of Jiamusi city (Heilongjiang) has a TFR of 0.41, which is the lowest TFR recorded anywhere in the world in recorded history. Other extremely low TFR counties are: 0.43 in the Heping district of Tianjin city (Tianjin), and 0.46 in the Mawei district of Fuzhou city (Fujian). At the other end TFR was 3.96 in Geji County (Tibet), 4.07 in Jiali County (Tibet), and 5.47 in Baqing County (Tibet).

The 2010 census reported a TFR of 1.18 (0.88 in cities, 1.15 in townships, and
1.44 in rural areas).
The five regions with the lowest fertility rates were Beijing (0.71), Shanghai
(0.74), Liaoning (0.74), Heilongjiang (0.75), and Jilin (0.76). The five regions with the highest
fertility rates were Guangxi (1.79), Guizhou (1.75), Xinjiang (1.53), Hainan (1.51), and Anhui
(1.48).

Total fertility rate by ethnic group (2010 census): Han (1.14), Zhuang (1.59), Hui (1.48), Manchu (1.18), Uyghur (2.04), Miao (1.82), Yi (1.82), Tujia (1.74), Tibetan (1.60), Mongols (1.26).

The 2020 census reported a TFR of 1.3, but some experts believe that after adjusting for the transient effects of the relaxation of restrictions, China’s actual TFR is as low as 1.1.

Labor force
In 2012, for the first time, according to the National Bureau of Statistics in January 2013, the number of people theoretically able to enter the Chinese labor force (individuals aged 15 to 59), shrank slightly to 937.27 million, a decrease of 3.45 million from 2011. This trend, resulting from a demographic transition, is anticipated to continue until at least 2030.
The World Factbook estimated the 2019 active labor force was 774.71 million.

Height and weight
As of 2020, the average Chinese man was 169.7 centimeters tall (5 ft 7 in) in 2019, the figures showed, and women's average height was 158 centimeters (5 ft 2.2 in). The same study showed an average Chinese man weighed 69.6 kilograms (153.4 lbs, or 11 stone 0 lbs), up 3.4 kilograms (7.5 lbs) over 10 years, while women were 1.7 kilograms (3.8 pounds) heavier on average at 59 kilograms (130.1 pounds, or 9 stone 4.1 lbs). They were up 1.2 centimeters (0.47  in) and 0.8 centimeters (0.31 in) respectively from 5 years earlier.

Gender balance
Future challenges for China will be the gender disparity. According to the 2020 census, males account for 51.24% of China's 1.41 billion people, while females made up 48.76% of the total. The sex ratio (the number of males for each female in a population) at birth was 118.06 boys to every 100 girls (54.14%) in 2010, higher than the 116.86 (53.89%) of 2000, but 0.53 points lower than the ratio of 118.59 (54.25%) in 2005. In most Western countries the sex ratio at birth is around 105 boys to 100 girls (51.22%).

Ethnic groups 

The People's Republic of China (PRC) officially recognizes 56 distinct ethnic groups, the largest of which are Han, who constitute 91.51% of the total population in 2010. Ethnic minorities constitute 8.49% or 113.8 million of China's population in 2010. During the past decades ethnic minorities have experienced higher growth rates than the majority Han population, because they are not under the one-child policy. Their proportion of the population in China has grown from 6.1% in 1953, to 8.04% in 1990, 8.41% in 2000, and 8.49% in 2010. Large ethnic minorities (data according to the 2000 census) include the Zhuang (16 million, 1.28%), Manchu (10 million, 0.84%), Uyghur (9 million, 0.78%), Hui (9 million, 0.71%), Miao (8 million, 0.71%), Yi (7 million, 0.61%), Tujia (5.75 million, 0.63%), Mongols (5 million, 0.46%), Tibetan (5 million, 0.43%), Buyei (3 million, 0.23%), and Korean (2 million, 0.15%). Over 126,000 Westerners from Canada, the US and Europe are living in Mainland China. Almost 1% of people living in Hong Kong are Westerners.

Neither Hong Kong nor Macau recognizes the official ethnic classifications maintained by the central government. In Macau, the largest substantial ethnic groups of non-Chinese descent are the Macanese, of mixed Chinese and Portuguese descent (Eurasians), as well as migrants from the Philippines and Thailand. Overseas Filipinos (overwhelmingly female) working as domestic workers comprise the largest non-Han Chinese ethnic group in Hong Kong.

People from other immigration jurisdictions
The 2010 Census counted 234,829 residents from Hong Kong, 21,201 residents from Macao, 170,283 residents from Taiwan, and 593,832 residents from other locations, totaling 1,020,145 residents.

Religions

Migration

Internal migration in the People's Republic of China is one of the most extensive in the world according to the International Labour Organization. In fact, research done by Kam Wing Chan of the University of Washington suggests that "In the 30 years since 1979, China's urban population has grown by about 440 million to 622 million in 2009. Of the 440 million increase, about 340 million was attributable to net migration and urban reclassification. Even if only half of that increase was migration, the volume of rural-urban migration in such a short period is likely the largest in human history."  Migrants in China are commonly members of a floating population, which refers primarily to migrants in China without local household registration status through the Chinese Hukou system. In general, rural-urban migrant workers are most excluded from local educational resources, citywide social welfare programs and many jobs because of their lack of hukou status.

In 2011 a total of 252.78 million migrant workers (an increase of 4.4% compared to 2010) existed in China. Out of these, migrant workers who left their hometown and worked in other provinces accounted for 158.63 million (an increase of 3.4% compared to 2010) and migrant workers who worked within their home provinces reached 94.15 million (an increase of 5.9% compared to 2010). Estimations are that Chinese cities will face an influx of another 243 million  migrants by 2025, taking the urban population up to nearly 1 billion people. This population of migrants would represent "almost 40 percent of the total urban population," a number which is almost three times the current level. While it is often difficult to collect accurate statistical data on migrant floating populations, the number of migrants is undoubtedly quite large. "In China's largest cities, for instance, it is often quoted that at least one out of every five persons is a migrant." China's government influences the pattern of urbanization through the Hukou permanent residence registration system, land-sale policies, infrastructure investment and the incentives offered to local government officials. The other factors influencing migration of people from rural provincial areas to large cities are employment, education, business opportunities and higher standard of living.

The mass emigration known as the Chinese diaspora, which occurred from the 19th century to 1949, was mainly caused by wars and starvation in mainland China, invasion from various foreign countries, as well as the problems resulting from political corruption. Most immigrants were illiterate peasants and manual labourers, called "coolies" by analogy to the same pattern of immigration from India, who emigrated to work in countries such as the Americas, Australia, South Africa and Southeast Asia.

Urbanization

Urbanization increased in speed following the initiation of the reform and opening policy. By the end of 2014, 54.7% of the total population lived in urban areas, a rate that rose from 26% in 1990.

Demographic statistics
Demographic statistics according to the World Population Review.

The following demographic statistics are from the CIA World Factbook, unless otherwise indicated.
No statistics have been included for areas currently governed by the Republic of China (Taiwan). Unless stated otherwise, statistics refer only to mainland China. (See Demographics of Hong Kong and Demographics of Macau.)
Population
Mainland only: 1,411,750,000 (2022)
Hong Kong: 7,276,588 (2015)
Macau: 635,293 (2015)
Total: 1,387,096,243 (2015).
Population rank: 1 (See List of countries by population.)

Urban-rural ratio
Urban: 61.4% (2020) 
Rural: 38.6% (2020) 

Age structure

0–14 years: 17.29% (male 129,296,339/female 111,782,427)
15–24 years: 11.48% (male 86,129,841/female 73,876,148)
25–54 years: 46.81% (male 333,789,731/female 318,711,557)
55–64 years: 12.08% (male 84,827,645/female 83,557,507)
65 years and over: 12.34% (male 81,586,490/female 90,458,292) (2020 est.)

0–14 years: 17.2% (2015)
15–64 years: 72.0% (2015)
65 years and: 10.8% (2015)

Median age
total: 38.4 years Country comparison to the world: 62nd
male: 37.5 years
female: 38.4 years (2021 est.)

Population growth rate
-0.06% (2022 est.) Country comparison to the world: 175th

Birth rate
6.77 births/1,000 population (2022 est.) Country comparison to the world: 169th

Death rate
7.37 deaths/1,000 population (2022 est.) Country comparison to the world: 77th

Net migration rate
-0.43 migrant(s)/1,000 population (2021 est.) Country comparison to the world: 122nd

Population growth rate
Population growth rate: -0.06% (2022)

Sex distribution
Sex distribution: 1.06 males/females (2020)

Sex ratio
At birth: 1.11 male(s)/female (2020)
Under 15 years: 1.16 male(s)/female (2020)
15–24 years: 1.17 male(s)/female (2020)
25–54 years: 1.02 male(s)/female (2020)
65 years and over: 0.9 male(s)/female (2020)
Total population: 1.06 male(s)/female (2020)

Infant mortality rate
Total: 11.5 deaths/1,000 live births (2020 est)
Male: 11.6 deaths/1,000 live births (2020 est)
Female: 10.64 deaths/1,000 live births (2020 est)

See Infant mortality in China

Urbanization
urban population: 59.2% of total population (2018)
rate of urbanization: 2.4% annual rate of change (2015–20 est.) 
note: data do not include Hong Kong and Macau

Life expectancy at birth
Total population: 76.31 years (2021)
Male: 74.23 years (2021)
Female: 78.62 years (2021)

Religious affiliation

 Predominantly: Mahayana Buddhism, Taoism, Confucianism (via ancestral worship).
 Others: Christianity (3–4%), Islam (1.5%), ethnic minority religions, others.
 Note: State atheism, but traditionally pragmatic and eclectic.

Sources:

See also

Megalopolises in China
Metropolitan cities of China
Demographics of Central Asia
Demographics of Beijing
 Population history of China
Secession in China
Language Atlas of China

Notes

References

Citations

Sources